OUCC may be one of the following Oxford University clubs:

 Oxford University Chess Club
 Oxford University Cricket Club
 Oxford University Cycling Club
 Oxford University Cave Club